Margaret Buechner (May 27, 1922 – June 8, 1998) was a German-born American composer.

Born in Hanover, she emigrated to the United States in 1951 and became an American citizen in 1961. Her works include the ballets Phantomgreen and Elizabeth, along with tone poems The Old Swedes Church and Erlkönig (based on the Goethe poem). Other major works are two related to her adopted country: Liberty Bell for chorus and orchestra, which incorporates a 1959 recording of the actual bell by Columbia Records, and the "symphonic trilogy" The American Civil War. She died in Midland, Michigan, at the age of 76.

External links
Nord-Disc Record Company, publisher of Buechner's music

1922 births
1998 deaths
American women composers
German emigrants to the United States
People from Midland, Michigan
20th-century American composers
Musicians from Michigan
Musicians from Hanover
20th-century American women musicians
20th-century American musicians
20th-century women composers